The New York Saints are a former member of the National Lacrosse League. They played at the Nassau Coliseum in Uniondale, New York, from 1989 to 2003. They became an inactive team after the 2002–03 season and were officially defunct in 2006.

The Saints had played in the Major Indoor Lacrosse League from 1987 to 1988 in New Jersey (at Brendan Byrne Arena) as the New Jersey Saints. The Saints won the 1988 MILL championship.

Awards and honors

All-time record

Playoff results

Defunct National Lacrosse League teams
Sports in Long Island
Lacrosse teams in New York (state)
Lacrosse clubs established in 1989
Lacrosse clubs disestablished in 2003
Major Indoor Lacrosse League teams
1999 establishments in New York (state)
2003 disestablishments in New York (state)